Michel Hmaé (born 21 March 1978) is a footballer who used to play for AS Magenta in the New Caledonian football league. He has been playing as a striker for the Noumea outfit since 2003/2004. In January 2010, he signed for AS Mont-Dore.

Hmaé is regular in the New Caledonia national football team. At international level, Michel Hmaé scored 6 goals in the Oceania Nations Cup 2004, including 5 against the Cook Islands. In the South Pacific Games in 2003, he scored 4 goals against Micronesia.

Achievements
Topscorer of Tahiti Ligue 1
 2001-02 (23 Goals)
Topscorer of New Caledonia Division Honneur
 2006 (12 goals)

References

External links

1978 births
Living people
New Caledonian footballers
New Caledonia international footballers
New Caledonian expatriate footballers
Association football forwards
A.S. Pirae players
AS Magenta players
AS Mont-Dore players
2008 OFC Nations Cup players